Kamrunag Lake is located in the Mandi district of Himachal Pradesh, India.

In July 2020, The Himachal Pradesh State Biodiversity Board announced that the lake and the surrounding area would be recognized as a Biodiversity Heritage Site. There are many medicinal plants and special trees in the area around the lake which will be protected once it has been declared a Biodiversity Heritage Site.

Folklore 
Local people believe that Dev Kamrunag appears every year to give blessings to his devotees in exchange for their offerings of flowers, coins or paper currency which they toss into Kamrunag Lake. There is an ancient stone idol of Dev Kamrunag near the lake, hence the name of the lake. Each year Dev Kamrunag is expected to appear in the month of June, during which time there is a big fair, where thousands of people from different places flock to see and worship Dev Kamrunag and take his blessings. 

It is said that Kamrunag Lake contains riches worth millions or even billions, but that no one has ever tried to steal from the lake for it is believed that misfortune follows the people who do this bad deed. The legend is that the lake is guarded by its guardians and protects it from people with bad intentions. People from all over the world and also Indians visit this lake and offer valuables to the lake for the betterment and fulfilment of their wishes. This has led to the accumulation of wealth at the bottom of the lake. People offer gold, silver, coins, and also currency notes to the lake.

Etymology 
The lake has its name because of a story from Mahabharata. It is said that Barbarika, the son of Ghatotkacha, wanted to fight in the war and asked for permission from his mother. His mother then told him to fight for the side which was losing the war. Lord Krishna, after hearing about this, went to Barbarika to test him, as he already knew that the Kaurava side was going to lose the war in the end. Krishna took the form of a Brahman and challenged him to pierce all the leaves of a nearby Peepal tree. As Barbarika took out an arrow to shoot, Lord Krishna stepped on a leaf and kept it under his foot. After the arrow pierced all the leaves on the tree, it turned to pierce the last one which was under Lord Krishna's foot. He quickly stepped away from it and the arrow pierced the leaf. After this, Lord Krishna devised a plan: he asked for alms from Barbarika and made him promise to give anything he asked for. After he made the promise, Lord Krishna returned to his original form and asked Barbarika his head. Barbarika agreed to this and asked Lord Krishna for one request, which was to let him watch the Mahabharata. Lord Krishna took his head to the battlefield and let him watch the battle. After the battle was over Lord Krishna blessed him that he will be worshipped as Khatu Shyam and his body will be worshipped as Kamru.

References 

Lakes of Himachal Pradesh
Biodiversity Heritage Sites of India